Odell is a small unincorporated community in Jackson Township, Tippecanoe County, in the U.S. state of Indiana.

The community is part of the Lafayette, Indiana Metropolitan Statistical Area.

History
John W. Odell settled the site in 1831, with ownership of the farm later passing to his son, Washington.  The location, originally known as Odell's Corners, gained a post office in 1871, which ran until it was discontinued in 1900.

Geography 
Odell is located at 40°17'16" North, 87°04'27" West (40.287778, -87.073889) in Jackson Township at the intersection of State Roads 25 and 28.

References 

Unincorporated communities in Tippecanoe County, Indiana
Unincorporated communities in Indiana
Lafayette metropolitan area, Indiana